Land drainage in the UK has a specific and particular meaning as a result of a number of  Acts of Parliament such as the Land Drainage Act 1991. In this context, land drainage refers to the responsibilities and activities of "internal drainage districts" and "internal drainage boards", both of which are specifically defined by relevant legislation. The land drainage responsibilities of the boards and districts are limited to works on main rivers. Such works encompass any reasonable activity to maintain an adequate channel in the river to carry a 1 in 100 year river flow event. Such activities may include dredging, weed clearing, the raising of flood embankments etc.

See also
Drainage law
Land drainage (disambiguation)

References

 
Bodies of water
Rivers
Flood control in the United Kingdom
English law